Kola Ige (born 28 December 1985 in Nigeria) is a Nigerian footballer. He currently plays for Bayelsa United F.C. in Nigeria.

International career 
He was member of the Nigeria U-20 team by 2005 FIFA World Youth Championship in the Netherlands, but didn't appear in the tournament.

References 

1985 births
Living people
Nigerian footballers
Nigeria under-20 international footballers
Bayelsa United F.C. players
Association football goalkeepers
Yoruba sportspeople